Ammayi Bagundi is a 2004 Indian Telugu-language film directed by Balasekaran, starring Sivaji and Meera Jasmine (in her Telugu debut). The music is scored by Srilekha and it produced by Dega Deva Kumar Reddy. It is a remake of the Tamil film Parthiban Kanavu (2003). This movie was dubbed into Malayalam as Manjupeyyum Munpe.

Plot

Shiva is a marketing executive. Shiva's parents want him to get married but he does not believe in arranged marriage and waits for a girl he likes. One day, Shiva sees a girl and is immediately attracted to her. He follows her and finds her office location. Every day Shiva sees her while she is on the way to her office. Also, Shiva learns that her tastes and interests match his and starts to love her.

Meanwhile, Shiva's parents decide to get him married to a well reputed contractor's daughter and force him to meet her. Shiva goes to meet the girl without any interest. But to his surprise, the girl, Sathya, is the one he admires. Shiva feels happy.

Shiva and Sathya get married. On the way back to their home, Shiva finds the girl in the same place where he sees her before daily. He is surprised when he realises that Sathya is the look alike of the girl whom he loved. Shiva visits the girl's office and enquires about her. He learns that the other girl's name is Janani and she has come for a project temporarily. Also Shiva starts maintaining distance from his wife Sathya as he finds her interests are different from his. Sathya is more responsible and she understands that her husband is confused and tolerates his behaviour. Shiva's friend Dada Giri advises him to accept Sathya as his wife and to forget Janani. Slowly, Shiva starts understanding his wife Sathya. But to everyone's surprise, Janani comes to stay in a flat opposite to Shiva's. Sathya meets Janani and is surprised to see her look alike.

Everyone from Sathya's family come to meet Janani and get surprised. Janani is fun-loving. Shiva does not disclose that he knew Janani before and starts befriending her. Dada Giri understands that Shiva is slowly moving away from his wife Sathya and is getting attracted towards Janani. So he plans to reveal everything to Janani, so that she will leave the place. Dada Giri meets Sathya and misunderstands her as Janani (as Sathya always wears saree while Janani is in modern attire). Without knowing that it is Sathya, He reveals all the truth about Shiva's secret love towards Janani and requests her to vacate the place, so that Shiva can lead a happy life with Sathya. He is surprised to learn that it was Sathya and not Janani.

Sathya cries and leaves to her parents' home.when Shiva went to her house she defends her husband before her parents. Janani wants Shiva to meet in a temple. Janani asks about his love towards her. But Shiva replies that he loved her before and when he realised his wife's love towards him, he changed his mind. He also says that he will wait until Sathya changes her mind and returns to live with him. But now, it is Sathya disguised as Janani and the meeting plan was set by Janani. Sathya feels happy hearing her husband praising her. Shiva and Sathya live happily while Janani vacates her flat wishing them good luck.

Cast
 Sivaji as Shiva
 Meera Jasmine in dual role as Janani and Sathya
 Ali as Dada Giri – Shiva's friend
 Bhavana as Dada Giri's wife
 Brahmanandam as Sales Executive Manager
 Siva Krishna as Shiva's father
 Chitram Seenu
 Sudha as Shiva's mother
 Rajan P. Dev as Sathya's father
 Shanoor Sana as Satya's mother
 M. S. Narayana as Shiva's uncle
 Duvvasi Mohan as Shop-keeper
 Surya as Janani's father
 Hema as Janani's mother
 Telangana Shakuntala in a cameo appearance

Soundtrack 

The film's soundtrack, marketed by Aditya Music, was released on 3 June 2004 by M.M. Srilekha.

References

External links
 

2000s Telugu-language films
2004 films
Telugu remakes of Tamil films
Films directed by Balasekaran